Comarca de Guijuelo is a comarca in the province of Salamanca, Castile and León.  It contains the following subcomarcas:

 Entresierras,  which contains the municipalities of Casafranca, Endrinal, Frades de la Sierra, Herguijuela, La Sierpe, Los Santos, Membribe de la Sierra and Monleón.
 Salvatierra, which contains the municipalities of Aldeavieja de Tormes, Berrocal, Fuenterroble, Guijuelo, Montejo, Pedrosillo de los Aires, Pizarral and Salvatierra de Tormes.
 Alto Tormes, which contains the municipalities of Cespedosa de Tormes, Gallegos de Solmirón, Navamorales, Puente del Congosto, El Tejado, Guijo de Ávila and La Tala.

References 

Comarcas of the Province of Salamanca